Mount Ropar is a mountain, 2,420 m, at the east extremity of Canopy Cliffs in Queen Elizabeth Range. Named by Advisory Committee on Antarctic Names (US-ACAN) for Nicholas J. Ropar, Jr., Weather Central meteorologist at Little America V, 1958.
 

Mountains of the Ross Dependency
Shackleton Coast